R v Smith is a case decided by the Special Court created by the Indemnity and Special Tribunals Act, 1900 (No 6), sitting in the buildings of the Supreme Court of the Colony of the Cape of Good Hope. It relates to whether superior orders are an excuse or justification. It has been called a leading case.

According to the Cape Times Law Reports, the ratio decidendi of this case is as follows: The orders of a superior officer so long as they are neither obviously and decidedly illegal nor opposed to the well-established customs of the Army, must be completely and unhesitatingly obeyed by a soldier subordinate to such officer. But if such commands are obviously illegal, the inferior will be justified in questioning or even refusing to execute them. An officer or soldier acting under orders from his superior which are not necessarily nor manifestly illegal, will be justified in obeying such orders.

Facts
During the Second Boer War, on 22 November 1899, Peter William Smith, a member of the Cape Police Force and part of a patrol of British troops under the direct command of Captain Chas F Cox, shot and killed John Dolley, a native servant, at Jackhalsfontein, Colesberg, then in Cape Colony, for failing to produce a missing bridle, in obedience to the order "If he does not look sharp, put a hole through him" given by Cox. Smith was charged with the murder of Dolley.

Judgment
Stephen said that in delivering judgment the Court, which was performing the duties of a jury as well as those of judges, found as a fact that Captain Cox believed that Dolley knew where the bridle was when he was told to fetch it, and that he willfully refused to do so; otherwise, there was no disputed question of fact of any importance for them to decide.

The Court in announcing the law on which they acted left on one side the questions whether Captain Cox's order was in fact lawful and whether if it were not his acts and those of Smith were covered by the Act of Indemnity: and held that even if Captain Cox's order was unlawful, Smith was bound to obey it if it was not obviously and decidedly in opposition to the law of the land, or to the well-known established customs of the army. The rule was that if a soldier honestly believed he was doing his duty in obeying the commands of his superior and if the orders were not so manifestly illegal that he must or ought to have known that they were unlawful, the private soldier was protected by the order of his superior officer. Smith was accordingly acquitted.

Novelty
This case was the first to be heard before the Special Court.

It was reserved for the Court to give the first authoritative judgment on what had previously been a moot point, namely, what according to civil, as opposed to military, law is the position of a soldier who commits homicide at the order of his superior officer?

In 1901, Stephen said:

Subsequent judicial history
This case was followed in R v Celliers. It was not followed in R v Van Vuuren. It was held not to apply to the order in R v Werner.

Reports
This case was reported in the Supreme Court Reports and the Cape Times Law Reports.
In 1901, Stephen said that the report in the Cape Times was the best report yet to hand and he hoped a proper report of the case might be produced in some form easily accessible to the English practitioner.

Bail

The Supreme Court of the Cape of Good Hope refused Smith's application for bail.

References
The Digest of South African Case Law. Consolidated Edition. Juta & Co. Cape Town and Johannesberg. Volume 1. Column 372. 1927. Volume 2. Column 154.
Manfred Nathan. The Common Law of South Africa. African Book Company. 1907. Volume 4. Page 2422.
Anders and Ellson. The Criminal Law of South Africa. W E Hortor & Co. Johannesburg. 1915. Pages 7, 131 & 214. 
Callie R Snyman. Criminal Law. Butterworths. Durban. 3rd Edition. 1995. Pages 124 and 125. 4th Edition. 2002. Pages 133 and 134. 5th Edition. LexisNexis. 2008. Page 138.
Clemence Masango. Criminal Law Manual. Juta Zimbabwe (Pvt). 1995. Page 44.
O'Connor and Fairall. Criminal Defences. 2nd Edition. Butterworths. 1988. Pages 166 & 167.
"Legal News" (1901) 45 The Solicitors' Journal 602 (22 June 1901)
"A Soldier's Responsibility when acting under orders" (1901) 18 South African Law Journal 110. See also p 103.
"The Plea of "Superior Orders" in War Crime Cases" (1945) 95 The Law Journal 242 (28 July 1945)
Bradford, "Barbarians at the Gates" [2004] 73 Mississippi Law Journal 639 at 849
Green, "Superior Orders and Command Responsibility" (2003) 175 Military Law Review 309 at  321

Attribution

1900 in the Cape Colony
1900 in case law
South African criminal case law
Second Boer War